The oldest known list of bishops of Chartres is found in an 11th-century manuscript of Trinity Abbey, Vendôme. It includes 57 names from Adventus (Saint Aventin) to Aguiertus (Agobert) who died in 1060. The most well-known list is included in the Vieille Chronique of Chartres (1389).

To 1000 

 Saint Aventus (Adventinus)
 Optatus
 Valentinus c. 395
 Martin le Blanc (Martinus Candidus)
 Aignan
 Severe
 Castor
 Africanus (?)
 Possesseur (Possessor)
 Polychronius
 Palladius (?)
 Arbogast
 Flavius (?)  
 Saint Solen or Solenne (Solemnis) 483-507
 c. 511 Saint Aventin
 ?–552 Etherius, also Euthere (Etherus)
 Leobinus, 544-557
 ?–567 Calétric of Chartres
 Pappolus (Papulus, Pabulus)
 Boetharius or Bohaire, Betharius, Béthaire de Chartres c.594-?
 Magnobode or Magobertus, Magnebodus, Mugoldus (?)
 Sigoald
 Mainulf
 Thibaut
 Lancegesile or Bertegisilus (Leodegisilus, Lancissilus, Langesilisus, Bertegisilus)
 c. 640–658?: Saint Malard
 Gaubert or Gausbert (Gaubertus, Gausbertus)
 Deodat (?)
 Dromus, Dronus, Drono, Pronus, Promus, Promo (?)
 Berthegran (?)
 Haynius (?)
 Agirard or Airard (Agirardus, Aidradus, Airardus, Aicardus, Haigradus)
 Agatheus (?)
 Leobert (Leobertus, Leudisbertus) c. 723
 Hado (?)
 Flavius (?)
 Godessald (?) also Godosaldus, Godalsadus
 Bernoin (Bernoinus, Hernoinus, Hieronymus)
 Helie ca. 840 and 849
 c. 854: Bouchard (Burchardus)
 Frotbold 855–857
 Gislebert or Gilbert (Gislebertus, Willebertus, Galeverius, Galtherus) 859 and 878
 Aymon (?)
 Gerard or Girard (?)
 Aymeric or Aymery
 Gancelme or Goussaume (Waltelmus, Wantelmus, Waltelmus, Gancelinus, Gantelmus, Ancelmus, Gancelmus...)
 Aganon or Haganon ca. 931 and 940
 Rainfroy ca. 949–950
 Hardouin
 Vulfaldus or Ulphardus
 c. 984: Eudes (Odo)

1000 to 1300 

 1007–1028: Fulbert of Chartres
 1028–1048: Thierry (Theodoricus)
 1048–1060: Agobert (Agobertus, Agenertus, Aivertus, Adevertus)
 1060–1064/1065: Hugo
 1065–1069: Robert de Tours
 1069–1075: Arrald
 1075–1076: Robert de Grantemesnil
 1077–1089: Geoffroy I.
 1089–1115: Ivo of Chartres
 1115–ca. 1148: Geoffroy II. de Lèves
 1148–1155: Gosselin de Lèves
 1155–1164: Robert
 1164–1176: William of the White Hands (House of Blois)
 1176–1180: John of Salisbury
 1181–1183: Pierre de Celle
 1182–1217: Renaud de Bar (or de Mousson)
 1218–1234: Gautier
 1234–1236: Hugues de La Ferté
 1236–1244: Aubry Cornut
 1244–1246: Henri de Grez (de Gressibus)
 1247–1259: Mathieu des Champs (de Campis)
 1259–1276: Pierre de Mincy
 1277–1297: Simon de Perruchay
 1298–1315: Jean de Garlande

1300 to 1500 

 1316–1326: Robert de Joigny
 1326–1328: Pierre de Chappes
 1328–1332: Jean du Plessis-Pasté
 1332–1342: Aymery de Chastellux
 ????–????: Guillaume Amy (Amici) (also bishop of Apt)
 ????–1357: Louis de Vaucemain
 1357–1360: Simon Lemaire (also bishop of Dol)
 1360–????: Jean d'Anguerant
 Guillaume de Chanac
 ????–????: Guérin d'Arcy
 ????–1390: Jean Lefèvre
 1391–1406: Jean de Montaigu
 ????–1415: Martin Gouge de Charpaigne
 1415–1418: Philippe de Boisgilon
 ????–1432: Jean de Frétigny
 1432–1434: Robert Dauphin
 ????–1441: Thibaut Lemoine
 1442–1443: Pierre de Comborn
 1444–1459: Pierre Bèchebien
 1459–1492: Miles d'Illiers
 1492–1507: René d'Illiers

1500 to 1800 

 1507–1525: Érard de la Marck
 1525–1553: Louis Guillard (previously bishop of Tournai)
 1553–1573: Charles Guillard
 1573–1598: Nicolas de Thou
 1599–1620: Philippe Hurault de Cheverny
 1620–1642: Léonore d'Étampes de Valençay (also archbishop of Reims)
 1642–1656: Jacques Lescot
 1657–1690: Ferdinand de Neuville de Villeroy (previously bishop of Saint-Malo)
 1690–1709: Paul Godet des Marais
 1710–1746: Charles-François des Montiers de Mérinville
 1748–1780: Pierre-Augustin-Bernardin de Rosset de Fleury
 1780–1790: Jean-Baptiste-Joseph de Lubersac
 1791–1793: Nicolas Bonnet, a constitutional bishop
 In 1793, the Cathedral of Chartres was converted to a Temple of Reason. The Diocese was reestablished at the Concordat of 11 June 1817, although a new bishop was not appointed until 1821.

From 1800 

 Jean-Baptist-Marie-Anne-Antoine de Latil (1817–1824) (also Archbishop of Reims)
 Claude-Hippolyte Clausel de Montals (1824–1853)
 Louis-Eugène Regnault (1853–1889)
 François Lagrange (1889–1895)
 Bon-Arthur-Gabriel Mollien (1896–1904)
 Henri-Louis-Alfred Bouquet (1906–1926)
 Raoul-Octove-Marie-Jean Harscouët (1926–1954)
 Roger Michon (1955–1978)
 Michel Joseph Kuehn (1978–1991)
 Jacques Jean Joseph Jules Perrier (1991–1997) (also coadjutor bishop of Tarbes and Lourdes)
 Bernard-Nicolas Aubertin, O. Cist. (1998–2005) (then Archbishop of Tours)
 Michel Pansard (2005–2018)
 Philippe Christory (2018-present)

References

Roman Catholic dioceses in France
Diocese
Chartres Cathedral